Anders Lennart Törnkvist (March 4, 1920 – January 21, 1986) was a Swedish cross-country skier who competed in the late 1940s and early 1950s. He finished fourth in the 50 km event at the 1950 FIS Nordic World Ski Championships in Lake Placid, New York.

Törnkvist competed in two Winter Olympic Games in the 50 km event, finishing fifth in 1948 and tenth in 1952.

Cross-country skiing results
All results are sourced from the International Ski Federation (FIS).

Olympic Games

World Championships

References

1920 births
1986 deaths
Swedish male cross-country skiers
Cross-country skiers at the 1948 Winter Olympics
Cross-country skiers at the 1952 Winter Olympics
Olympic cross-country skiers of Sweden